was the second spiritual leader, Honseki, of Tenrikyo after the death of Nakayama Miki (Oyasama) in 1887, while Oyasama's son Shinnosuke became the administrative leader, the Shinbashira. Having received the "grant of speech" from Oyasama, Iburi dictated the Osashizu, additional divinely inspired instructions on the creation and maintenance of a Tenrikyo community.

Iburi was born in Murō, Nara in 1833, but was forced to leave when his family became despondent. He moved to modern-day Tenri, and sought out a wife. His first wife died in childbirth, while the second arranged marriage to a gambling addict was quickly annulled. His third wife became gravely ill after childbirth which led him to seek Tenrikyo. He became a member after his wife was healed and went to see Oyasama every day, supporting her during times of religious persecution.

Iburi presided over a period of rapid expansion for Tenrikyo, which saw it reach villages throughout Japan. In 1896, eight percent of all Japanese citizens were dues-paying adherents of Tenrikyo. Iburi petitioned the government to be separated from the Sect Shinto group Shinto Honkyoku; this petition was granted in 1908.

It was Iburi's intention to continue the Honseki position by passing on spiritual leadership to a worthy successor, while the Shinbashira position was passed on in the Nakayama family. He chose a woman, Naraito Ueda, for this position. But she became ill, and in 1918 a rumor was spread that she was insane, so the Honseki position ended with Iburi, and the Nakayama family took the reins as central leadership.

References

Further reading
Nakayama, S. (1936). Hitokotohanashi. Tenri, Japan: Tenrikyō Dōyūsha.
Okutani, B. (1949). Honseki Iburi Izō. Tenri, Japan: Tenrikyō Dōyūsha.
Tenrikyo Doyusha Publishing Company (2012). The Measure of Heaven: The Life of Izo Iburi, the Honseki (Tenrikyo Overseas Department, Trans.). Tenri, Japan: Tenrikyo Overseas Department. (Original work published 1997)
Ueda, E. (1995). Shinpan Iburi Izō den. Tokyo, Japan: Zenponsha.

Tenrikyo
1833 births
1907 deaths